Dadamah were a band from New Zealand, active during the early 1990s. The band consisted of Kim Pieters, Peter Stapleton, Roy Montgomery, and Janine Stagg. They released their sole album This Is Not a Dream in 1992. After the band broke up, the members went on to numerous other music projects, including Flies Inside The Sun, Doramaar, Dissolve, and Rain.

Discography

Studio albums
This Is Not a Dream (1992)
Singles
 Nicotine/High Time (1991)
 Scratch Sun/Radio Brain (1991)

References

External links
Dadamah page at Kranky website

Musical groups established in 1990
Musical groups disestablished in 1993
New Zealand indie rock groups